Camblain-l’Abbé is a commune in the Pas-de-Calais department in the Hauts-de-France region of France.

Geography
A farming village located 9 miles (15 km) northwest of Arras at the junction of the D341 with the D73E.

Population

Places of interest
 The church of St.Pierre, dating from the sixteenth century.

See also
Communes of the Pas-de-Calais department

References

Camblainlabbe